Ostrog is a Russian term for a small fort, typically wooden and often non-permanently staffed. Ostrogs were encircled by 4–6 metres high palisade walls made from sharpened trunks. The name derives from the Russian word строгать (strogat'), "to shave the wood". Ostrogs were smaller and exclusively military forts, compared to larger kremlins that were the cores of Russian cities. Ostrogs were often built in remote areas or within the fortification lines, such as the Great Abatis Line.

History

From the 17th century, after the start of the Russian conquest of Siberia, the word ostrog was used to designate the forts founded in Siberia by Russian explorers. Many of these forts later transformed into large Siberian cities.

When later Siberia became a favourite destination for criminals sent there to serve katorga, Siberian ostrogs became associated with imprisonment, and in the 18th and 19th centuries the word ostrog often meant prison.

See also
Kremlin (fortification)
Blockhouse

References

Ostrog at the Great Soviet Encyclopedia 

Fortifications by type
 
Castles by type